OPF may refer to:

Science and technology
 Gasoline particulate filter (German:  Otto particle filter), capturing soot particles from the petrol engine exhaust gases
 OEB Package Format, an eBook format
 OpenProject Foundation, the foundation for the open source web-based application OpenProject, registered 2012 in Berlin, Germany
 OpenProjectsFoundation, an open source software foundation, registered 2007 in Sofia, Bulgaria
 Optimal power flow, a technique used to simulate load flow through an AC power system

Other uses
 Miami-Opa Locka Executive Airport (IATA and FAA LID: OPF), Florida, US
 Orbiter Processing Facility, a class of hangars at Kennedy Space Center, Florida, US